Canadian is a city in, and the county seat of, Hemphill County, Texas, United States. The population was 2,649 at the 2010 census, up from 2,233 in 2000. It is named for the nearby Canadian River, a tributary of the Arkansas River. Incorporated in 1908, Canadian is sometimes called "the oasis of the High Plains". Canadian is on the eastern side of the Texas Panhandle, close to the border with Oklahoma.

History
In 1887 the city government began.

A portion of the Tom Hanks movie Cast Away was filmed in Canadian.

Geography
U.S. Routes 60 and 83 pass through the center of town as Second Street. US 60 leads northeast  to Enid, Oklahoma, and southwest  to Amarillo, while US 83 leads northwest  to Perryton and south  to Shamrock.

The distance to Amarillo, Texas is  if one traveled southeast, and the automobile distance to Austin, Texas is about eight and one half hours. Oklahoma City is closer in proximity to Canadian compared to the Texas city of Dallas. Nic Garcia of the Texas Tribune characterized Canadian as having "a sense of isolation."

Climate
Canadian has a cool semi-arid climate (Köppen BSk) that is almost wet enough to qualify as a humid subtropical climate (Cfa).

Demographics

2020 census

As of the 2020 United States census, there were 2,339 people, 908 households, and 627 families residing in the city.

2000 census
As of the census of 2000,  2,233 people, 869 households, and 625 families resided in the city. The population density was 1,731.0 people per square mile (668.3/km). The 1,047 housing units averaged 811.6 per square mile (313.4/km). The racial makeup of the city was 88.94% White, 0.22% African American, 0.76% Native American, 0.13% Asian, 0.04% Pacific Islander, 9.00% from other races, and 0.90% from two or more races. Hispanics or Latinos of any race were 18.76% of the population.

Of the 869 households, 35.0% had children under the age of 18 living with them, 60.9% were married couples living together, 7.6% had a female householder with no husband present, and 28.0% were not families. About 26.1% of all households were made up of individuals, and 13.5% had someone living alone who was 65 years of age or older. The average household size was 2.52 and the average family size was 3.04.

In the city, the population was distributed as 27.5% under the age of 18, 7.2% from 18 to 24, 26.8% from 25 to 44, 22.9% from 45 to 64, and 15.5% who were 65 years of age or older. The median age was 38 years. For every 100 females, there were 91.7 males. For every 100 females age 18 and over, there were 87.0 males.

The median income for a household in the city was $31,929, and for a family was $38,676. Males had a median income of $30,240 versus $17,083 for females. The per capita income for the city was $16,384. About 12.3% of families and 14.1% of the population were below the poverty line, including 19.4% of those under age 18 and 16.4% of those age 65 or over.

Education
The City of Canadian is served by the Canadian Independent School District.

Media
The Canadian Record is a daily newspaper that ended publication in 2023.

Culture
In 2023 Nic Garcia described the character of the residents as "tough but empathetic. Forward-looking yet conservative."

Notable people
Malouf Abraham Sr. (1915–1994), businessman and politician
Nahim Abraham (1885–1965), businessman
Ken King (born 1971), businessman and politician
Dave McCurdy (born 1950), businessman and politician
Richard A. Waterfield (1939–2007), rancher and politician 
Robert R. Young (1897–1958), businessman
Thomas Morgan Berry (1937-2005), Army  South Command Sergeant Major

Gallery

References

External links

 City of Canadian official website
 Canadian, TX in the Handbook of Texas
 New York Times, "New Life Where Towns and Teams Are Dying"

Cities in Texas
Cities in Hemphill County, Texas
County seats in Texas